Richmond by-election may refer to:

Australia
 1957 Richmond by-election
 1984 Richmond by-election

United Kingdom  London
 2016 Richmond Park by-election

United Kingdom  Yorkshire
 1872 Richmond (Yorks) by-election 
 1873 Richmond (Yorks) by-election
 1989 Richmond (Yorks) by-election